The , signed as Route 9, is one of the tolled routes of the Shuto Expressway system serving the Greater Tokyo Area. It connects Tokyo's Mukojima Route in central Tokyo to the Bayshore Route which connects Tokyo to its neighboring prefectures, Chiba Prefecture and Kanagawa Prefecture.

Route description
The Fukagawa Route is the northernmost of three routes linking the Bayshore Route to central Tokyo, as such, it primarily links Tokyo to destinations within Chiba Prefecture like Narita International Airport and the capital of the prefecture, Chiba. It is used less heavily than the more direct Komatsugawa Route and Keiyō Road to Chiba, so travel times along the Fukagawa Route to those destinations are often faster than the direct route.

Route 9 begins at Hakozaki Junction with the Mukojima Route in Chūō City above Tokyo City Air Terminal, a bus terminal for Airport Transport Service, an airport bus operator. From there it travels southeast crossing over the Sumida River into Kōtō City. Just before reaching Kiba Park the route turns south entering the part of Kōtō City made up of artificial islands on the northern edge of Tokyo Bay. Upon reaching the bay, the expressway terminates at Tatsumi Junction where it meets the bypass of Tokyo, the Bayshore Route.

The speed limit on the Fukagawa Route is set at 60 km/h. 

According to a 2015 survey conducted by the Ministry of Land, Infrastructure, Transport and Tourism, the road carried an average of 52,473 vehicles per day.

History
The entirety of the Fukagawa Route was opened to traffic on 5 February 1980 instead of being opened in phases like many of the other routes in the Shuto Expressway network.

Junction list

See also

References

External links

9
1980 establishments in Japan
Roads in Tokyo